Goodbye Hayabusa II: Hayabusa Graduation Ceremony was a professional wrestling pay-per-view (PPV) event produced by Frontier Martial-Arts Wrestling (FMW). The event was taped on August 23, 1999 and aired on pay-per-view via broadcast delay on DirecTV on August 25. This event was a part of the Goodbye Hayabusa tour used as build-up to the retirement of Eiji Ezaki's "Hayabusa" character and switch to a new character.

In the main event of the show, Hayabusa defeated Yukihiro Kanemura to win the FMW Brass Knuckles Heavyweight Championship. The event also featured the in-ring debut of Giant Steele, who debuted at Haunted House to assist Shoichi Arai in defeating Ricky Fuji.

Background
Eiji Ezaki was forced by FMW Commissioner Kodo Fuyuki to end his "Hayabusa" character on August 25 and Ezaki planned three major shows with Shoichi Arai as farewell to Hayabusa and build-up to his character change. At Goodbye Hayabusa II: Haunted House, Hayabusa unleashed his Darkside for the very last time in a six-man tag team match, which Darkside Hayabusa's team won. Hayabusa would be scheduled to challenge for the promotion's top title, the FMW Brass Knuckles Heavyweight Championship at the Hayabusa Graduation Ceremony pay-per-view.

Jado defeated Flying Kid Ichihara at Haunted House in a match which stipulated that Ichihara's valet Sena Wakana must remove her clothes if Jado won. Jado would win and Wakana undressed her clothes to reveal her undergarments beneath. Jado would be scheduled to team with Mr. Gannosuke against Ichihara and Naohiko Yamazaki in a match at Hayabusa Graduation Ceremony, in which Jado put a stipulation that Wakana must strip off her undergarments to show her naked body.

Results

References

1999 in professional wrestling
Events in Tokyo
August 1999 events in Asia
FMW Goodbye Hayabusa
Professional wrestling in Tokyo